Hawes is an English surname. Notable people with the surname include:

Politicians
Albert Gallatin Hawes, 19th-century U.S. Representative from Kentucky
Aylett Hawes, 19th-century American politician and planter from Virginia
Aylett Hawes Buckner, 19th-century U.S. Representative from Missouri
Sir Benjamin Hawes, 19th-century British Whig politician, known in UK parliament as "Hawes the Soap-Boiler"
Harry Bartow Hawes, 20th-century Democratic member of the U.S. House and the U.S. Senate from Missouri
Richard Hawes, 19th-century United States Representative from Kentucky and second Confederate Governor of Kentucky
William Hawes (miller), business owner and member of the Maine House of Representatives

Directors
James Hawes, the director and producer
Stanley Gilbert Hawes, documentary film producer and director

Authors
Charles Boardman Hawes
James Hawes (author), British novelist
Louise Hawes
Mary Jane Holmes
Mary Virginia Hawes Terhune, wrote under the penname Marion Harland
Peter Hawes, New Zealand playwright, novelist, and scriptwriter
Stephen Hawes, English poet during the Tudor period

Sportspeople
Ben Hawes, English field hockey player 
Emma Jean Hawes, American bridge player
Matthew Hawes, Canadian backstroke swimmer
Spencer Hawes, American basketball player
Steven Sherburne Hawes, American basketball player

Musicians
Hampton Hawes, African American jazz pianist
Patrick Hawes, British composer
William Hawes, English musician

American soldiers
James Morrison Hawes, 19th century brigadier general in the Confederate States Army during the American Civil War
Richard Ellington Hawes, 20th century United States naval officer

Other people
Harriet Boyd-Hawes, pioneering American archaeologist, nurse and relief worker
Jason Conrad Hawes, co-founder of The Atlantic Paranormal Society (TAPS), based in Warwick, Rhode Island
Monsignor John Hawes, architect and priest 
Keeley Hawes, English actress
Rodney A. Hawes, Jr., American business executive and philanthropist.

Surnames from given names